Codona is the first album by the jazz trio Codona, which featured sitarist and tabla player Collin Walcott, trumpeter Don Cherry and percussionist Naná Vasconcelos. It was recorded in 1978 and released on the ECM label in 1979.

Reception

The Allmusic review by Michael G. Nastos awarded the album 4 stars stating simply "These three communicate".

An article at Jazz Fuel titled "ECM Records – 10 Albums That Changed the Landscape of Jazz" states: "When Codona... made its self-titled debut in 1979, 'world music' didn't exist as its own category. In retrospect, some have applied the term to Codona's output as the first example of that very genre. Yet saying as much risks stripping away some of the color. They were a plural outfit in every sense: from the fact that all of them played various instruments to their melding of styles and influences into something that transcended the sum of its parts. Cherry's trumpet and Walcott's sitar are a pair for the ages, and find purest traction in every detail Vasconcelos provides. Other instrumental rapports, including that between wooden flute and hammered dulcimer, keep us on our toes as we parse the album's eclectic mix of chants and whispers, while an overarching lucidity grounds even the most metaphysical moments in the immediacy of lived experience."

In a review for All About Jazz, John Kelman described the group's philosophy as one "where everything is possible and no single stylistic marker could define its sound and aesthetic", and wrote: "Despite the large improvisational component of Codona... there's no question that this was a group with a concept. Given the vast number of instruments the trio had to work with, just the matter of choosing the right instruments for each piece suggests that considerable forethought went into all three of the group's recordings... And while Codona possessed a unique ability to create a surprisingly rich soundscape from the sparest of instrumental combinations... on record the trio did take advantage of overdubbing to create more expansive audioscapes... While later Codona releases would be more democratic, compositionally speaking... Codona's original music, other than the self-titled improv, is all from the sitarist/percussionist's pen, with one significant exception. Brief though it may be, at less than four minutes, 'Colemanwonder' is a curious medley of music from Ornette Coleman ('Race Face' and 'Sortie') and Stevie Wonder (his hit single, 'Sir Duke'). The idea of combining Coleman with Wonder may be as oblique as the late T.J. Kirk's combination of Thelonious Monk, James Brown and Rahsaan Roland Kirk, but it works almost in spite of itself, as Vasconcelos' cuica... interacts throughout with Cherry's trumpet and Walcott's sitar."

Tyran Grillo, writing for Between Sound and Space, stated the following concerning the opening track: "From the opening gong, this album enchants with its dramaturgy, in which time and space are one and the same. Against clicks and whistles, a subterranean sitar appears. In it, we hear the grumbling of voices. Cherry fills the vast emptiness with his sung trumpeting, so that the emptiness can only weep in return. Walcott's sitar is respectfully articulated, ever so subtle in its reverberant twang, providing a gelatinous backbone, such as it is, for Cherry's more immediate interpretations. From this, we get the tinny call of a clay drum and a flute hooked into every loophole, pulled to expose a more regular core... Walcott's tabla signals the phenomenological urgency with which divine creation takes form, as if finding amid the contact of fluttering fingers along pulled skin the key to unspeakable life."

Track listing
All compositions by Collin Walcott except as indicated
 "Like That of Sky" - 11:07 
 "Codona" (Cherry, Vasconcelos, Walcott) - 6:14 
 "Colemanwonder: Race Face/Sortie/Sir Duke" (Ornette Coleman/Coleman/Stevie Wonder) - 3:40 
 "Mumakata" - 8:14 
 "New Light" - 13:22 
Recorded at Tonstudio Bauer in Ludwigsburg, West Germany in September 1978

Personnel
Collin Walcott — sitar, tabla, hammered dulcimer, kalimba, voice
Don Cherry — trumpet, wood flute, doussn' gouni, voice
Naná Vasconcelos — percussion, cuica, berimbau, voice

References

ECM Records albums
Codona albums
1979 debut albums
Albums produced by Manfred Eicher